ICDS may stand for:
 Integrated Child Development Services
It was launched in 1975 in 33 community development blocks of the country and now it spread more than 400 CD (Community Development) blocks.
 International Conference on Defects in Semiconductors
The first conference was in 1959 and is a biannual event.